Chop Chop is an electropop band out of Los Angeles, California, founded in Boston, Massachusetts, and is on the Archenemy Record Company, home to such acts as  Freezepop, Lifestyle, The Texas Governor, Rockets Burst from the Streetlamps,  and Karacter.

History
The band was originally a trio centered on Catherine Cavanagh. The band's debut, self-titled album was recorded in Cavanagh's attic apartment, with Cavanagh
composing, arranging, playing guitars, drum machines, keyboards, and bass. The album also includes rhythms based on the sounds of a freight train moving and stopping. The album mixed guitar pop with electronics, and gained comparisons with artists such as Ladytron, with one reviewer describing it as "a truly inspired affair, raw in its approach and pure in its intent, a must-have for any fan of indie music with a distinct personality". PopMatters called the album "melodic, quirky and highly likeable" in one review but "a project that should've stayed in the bedroom" in another.

The other members of the band initially were Christy Cheng (keyboards), and Carla Ceruzzi (bass). All three members had the initials "CC", hence the band's name. Ceruzzi is no longer with the band, and in live performances, drummer Seth Damascus-Kennedy is added, working under the stage name "Carlos Cola".

The second album, Screens, was released in 2008. The Eugene Weekly described it as "mixing up its approaches to [electropop] but virtually nailing it, track after track".

Albums
Chop Chop (2006) Archenemy
Screens (2008) Archenemy
The Spark (2011) Archenemy

TV Licensing
 "Pinched" -Bachelor Party (How I Met Your Mother)
 "Play" -The Wedding Bride (How I Met Your Mother)

References

External links
 Official Website
 Myspace
 Giles, Geoff (2008) "Screens review", ESDMusic
 Cleary, Alex (2008) "Chop Chop "Screens" (Archenemy Records, 2008): Smart urbane electropop from gifted songstress", Americana UK
 Arnett, Rachel (2008) "Music shorts for November 6", The Daily Tar Heel
 Austin. Matthew (2008) "Chop Chop Screens" (review), 30music

Indie pop groups from Los Angeles
Indie pop groups from Massachusetts
American synth-pop groups
American women singer-songwriters
All-female bands
American women pop singers
Singer-songwriters from California
Singer-songwriters from Massachusetts